Clematis horripilata is a species of vine in the family Ranunculaceae. Its inflorescence contains several light greenish yellow flowers. This plant can be found in South Asia and Southeast Asia. It has been known by the synonym Naravelia laurifolia.

References

horripilata